A Horse Called Music is the 37th studio album by the country singer Willie Nelson, released in 1989. The album includes Nelson's last number 1 single, "Nothing I Can Do About It Now". "There You Are" peaked at No. 8 on the Billboard country chart.

Track listing 
"Nothing I Can Do About It Now" (Beth Nielsen Chapman) – 3:17  
"The Highway" (Tom Conner, Richard Wesley) – 3:55  
"I Never Cared For You" (Nelson) – 2:25  
"If I Were a Painting" (Skip Ewing, Don Sampson) – 3:20  
"Spirit" (Kent Robbins, William Robinson) – 4:16  
"There You Are" (Kye Fleming, Mike Reid) – 3:04  
"Mr. Record Man" (Nelson)– 2:08  
"If My World Didn't Have You" (Chapman)– 3:42  
"A Horse Called Music" (Wayne Carson Thompson)– 4:26  
"Is the Better Part Over" (Nelson)– 3:31

Personnel 
Willie Nelson – Acoustic Guitar, vocals
Thomas Brannon – Vocals
Larry Byrom – Electric Guitar
Beth Nielsen Chapman – Vocals
Billy Gene English – Percussion, Drums
Paul English – Drums
Scott Jarrett – Vocals
Wendy Suits Johnson – Vocals
Jana King – Vocals
Larrie Londin – Drums
Grady Martin – Electric Guitar
Farrell Morris – Percussion
Bobbie Nelson – Piano
Louis Dean Nunley – Vocals
Bobby Ogdin – Piano
Larry Paxton – Bass
Jody Payne – Electric Guitar
Don Potter – Acoustic Guitar
Mickey Raphael – Harmonica
Ronnie Reno – Mandola
Lisa Silver – Vocals
Bee Spears – Bass
Bergen White – Arranger, Vocals
Chip Young – Acoustic Guitar
Reggie Young – Acoustic Guitar

Charts

Weekly charts

Year-end charts

References

External links
Interview with Willie Nelson - Raw Footage (1989) – Interview where Willie Nelson discusses the upcoming release of his new album, "A Horse Called Music"

1989 albums
Willie Nelson albums
Albums produced by Fred Foster
Columbia Records albums